War for the Planet of the Apes is a 2017 American science fiction film directed by Matt Reeves from a screenplay by Reeves and Mark Bomback, and produced by Peter Chernin, Dylan Clark, Rick Jaffa and Amanda Silver. It is the sequel to Dawn of the Planet of the Apes (2014) and the third installment in the Planet of the Apes reboot franchise. It stars Andy Serkis as Caesar, alongside Woody Harrelson and Steve Zahn. In the film, conflict between apes and humans has escalated into full war, and Caesar sets out to avenge those he has lost.

Development for War for the Planet of the Apes began in January 2014, after 20th Century Fox viewed Reeves' cut of its predecessor; his return was soon confirmed, along with Bomback's. A conditional 2016 release date was announced in May 2015, which led to a closer and faster pre-production relationship between writer and director. The film shares similarities to Battle for the Planet of the Apes (1973), with emphasis on the impact of psychosocial development and interaction of apes and humans. Casting began in August 2015 and finished that October, with principal photography commencing soon thereafter and concluding in March 2016, with filming locations including Lower Mainland and the Kananaskis Range.

War for the Planet of the Apes premiered on July 10, 2017 at the SVA Theatre in New York City, and was theatrically released worldwide by 20th Century Fox on July 14. The film received critical acclaim, with praise for Reeves' direction, Serkis' performance, visual effects, themes, emotional weight, Michael Giacchino's score, and Michael Seresin's cinematography. War for the Planet of the Apes was a commercial success, grossing over $490 million, and received numerous awards and nominations, including nominations for Best Visual Effects and Best Special Visual Effects at the 90th Academy Awards and 71st British Academy Film Awards, respectively. A sequel, titled Kingdom of the Planet of the Apes, is in development with a release date set for 2024.

Plot

A ruthless colonel leads the Alpha-Omega militia in an attempt to find Caesar and his tribe of intelligent apes with help from traitorous apes the militia refer to as "donkeys". A platoon finds an ape outpost, but the apes kill most of them and capture the survivors before releasing them as a sign of peace. Caesar's eldest son, Blue Eyes, and friend Rocket return from an oasis while searching for a safer home. Due to the sheer size of the tribe, Caesar plans to relocate them at a later date, but later that night, the colonel leads a team in infiltrating the apes' home and kills Caesar's wife and Blue Eyes after mistaking him for Caesar.

Caesar, accompanied by Rocket, orangutan Maurice, and gorilla Luca leave to serve as a decoy while the rest of the tribe leave for the oasis. While searching for information on the militia's movements, Caesar kills a scientist in self-defense and finds the man's mute daughter, whom Maurice befriends and later names Nova, giving her a rag doll. Later on their journey, the apes find Alpha-Omega militiamen who were also mute and killed by their fellow soldiers and encounter another intelligent ape named Bad Ape, who informs them that the militia is at a quarantine facility with an arsenal in the mountains. Joined by Bad Ape, Caesar's group find Alpha-Omega, but Luca is killed and Caesar is captured. Inside the facility, Caesar discovers the rest of his tribe was also captured and being forced to build a wall without food or water.

During a meeting with the Colonel, Caesar learns that Alpha-Omega is barricading the facility to fend off the United States army and that the simian flu has mutated, leaving the infected mute and primitive; He also learns that the Colonel ordered his men to kill the carriers before they could infect the others. After sustaining punishment from the militia and a donkey named Red, Caesar eventually convinces the Colonel to give the other apes food and water while he starves in their place. Nova sneaks into the facility to give water and her doll, Rocket allows himself to be captured to prevent her from being seen. The next morning, the colonel discovers and confiscates the doll.

Upon discovering an underground tunnel leading out of the facility, Maurice, Bad Ape, and Nova coordinate with Rocket and Caesar to rescue the apes, but they get caught in the army's attack on Alpha-Omega. Caesar sneaks into the colonel's quarters, intending to kill him, only to find he had been infected by Nova's doll. Caesar spares the colonel, who commits suicide. While escaping, Caesar attempts to destroy a fuel tank to take out the militia from behind but is shot by Preacher, one of the soldiers he set free. Seeing this, Red has a change of heart and kills Preacher before he is himself killed. Caesar detonates the tank, triggering an avalanche that kills the militia and the army while the apes and Nova climb nearby trees to safety.

Sometime later, the apes and Nova reach the oasis, where Maurice discovers Caesar's wounds and promises him that his son will know who Caesar was and what he did for the apes before Caesar dies.

Cast
 Andy Serkis as Caesar, a chimpanzee who is leader to a tribe of enhanced apes.
 Woody Harrelson as the Colonel, the leader of the paramilitary faction the Alpha-Omega. The militia employs around 400 militarized people, who remain confident as humanity's last bastion under the leadership of the Colonel.
 Steve Zahn as Bad Ape, a chimpanzee who manages to flee from the Sierra Safari Zoo after seeing his family and acquaintances being blamed for the simian flu and killed by the soldiers.
 Toby Kebbell as Koba, a treacherous bonobo who hates humans and is responsible for the war. Koba appears to Caesar as a hallucination.
 Gabriel Chavarria as Preacher, a crossbowman commander in the Alpha-Omega militia and the Colonel's right hand.
 Judy Greer as Cornelia, Caesar's chimpanzee wife.
 Karin Konoval as Maurice, a Bornean orangutan and Caesar's loyal adviser and friend.
 Terry Notary as Rocket, Caesar's loyal chimpanzee lieutenant.
 Michael Adamthwaite as Luca, a mountain gorilla in Caesar's tribe.
 Ty Olsson as Red, a western lowland gorilla who works for the Colonel as a "donkey".
 Devyn Dalton as Cornelius, Caesar's youngest chimpanzee son.
 Sara Canning as Lake, Blue Eyes' chimpanzee wife. She takes care of Cornelius.
 Aleks Paunovic as Winter, an albino western lowland gorilla in Caesar's tribe, who later joins forces with the Colonel.
 Amiah Miller as Nova, an orphan who is mute.
 Max Lloyd-Jones as Blue Eyes, Caesar's eldest chimpanzee son.
 Roger Cross as the Captain from the Alpha-Omega platoon.
 Mercedes De La Zerda as Lang, a soldier whose life is spared after the platoon assault failed and the survivors were captured. Later, she participates in the infiltration team at that night.
 Chad Rook as Boyle, a soldier from the quarantine facility who sees the construction of the defensive wall.

Production

Development

After seeing his cut of Dawn, 20th Century Fox and Chernin Entertainment signed Matt Reeves to return as director for a third installment of the reboot series. In January 2014, the studio announced the third film, with Reeves returning to direct and co-write along with Bomback, and Peter Chernin, Rick Jaffa and Amanda Silver serving as producers. During an interview in mid-November 2014 with MTV, Andy Serkis said they did not know the next film's setting. "...It could be five years after the event. It could be the night after the events of where we left Dawn." In May 2015, the title was first given as War of the Planet of the Apes. By October 2015, it had been retitled as War for the Planet of the Apes. When director Reeves and screenwriter Bomback came on board to helm Dawn, the film already had a release date, which led to an accelerated production schedule. However, with the third installment, Fox wanted to give the duo plenty of time to write and make the film. Taking advantage of this, the two bonded with each other more than before.

In interviews for Dawn, Reeves talked about the inevitable war Caesar would have with the humans: "As this story continues, we know that war is not avoided by the end of Dawn. That is going to take us into the world of what he is grappling with. Where he is going to be thrust into circumstances that he never, ever wanted to deal with, and was hoping he could avoid. And now he is right in the middle of it. The things that happen in that story test him in huge ways, in the ways in which his relationship with Koba haunts him deeply. It's going to be an epic story. I think you've probably read that I sort of described it where in the first film was very much about his rise from humble beginnings to being a revolutionary. The second movie was about having to rise to the challenge of being a great leader in the most difficult of times. This is going to be the story that is going to cement his status as a seminal figure in ape history, and sort of leads to an almost biblical status. He is going to become like a mythic ape figure, like Moses."

Toby Kebbell, who portrayed Koba in Dawn, had expressed interest in reprising his role or performing as other characters. Plans to include Koba in a larger role in the film were abandoned early, with Bomback saying, "If you stayed until the very end of Dawn of the Planet of the Apes, you hear Koba's breathing. We did that to give us a tiny crack of a possibility that we could revive Koba if we wanted to. Very early on in spitballing, we realized there was nothing more to do with Koba—certainly nothing that would exceed what he had done in the last story. But we knew we wanted to keep him alive as an idea. In playing out the reality of what happened at the end of the last film, Caesar would be traumatized by having to kill his brother. That would have resonance, and we wanted to make sure that did not get lost. So the answer was that we could go inside Caesar's mind at this point and revisit Koba that way."

Casting
In August 2015, Deadline reported that Gabriel Chavarria had been cast as one of the humans in the film. In September 2015, The Hollywood Reporter announced that Woody Harrelson had been cast as the film's antagonist, and that Chavarria's role was supporting. In October 2015, TheWrap reported that Steve Zahn was cast as a new ape in the film. It was also announced that actress Amiah Miller was cast as one of the film's humans, with Judy Greer and Karin Konoval reprising their roles as Cornelia and Maurice, while Aleks Paunovic and Sara Canning were cast as new apes.

Filming
Principal photography on the film began on October 14, 2015, in the Lower Mainland in Vancouver, under the working title Hidden Fortress. Filming was expected to take place there until early March 2016. Parts of the film were expected to shoot for up to five days in the Kananaskis in late January and early February. In March, Serkis confirmed that he had finished shooting his portions.

Visual effects
As with Rise and Dawn, the visual effects for War were created by Weta Digital; the apes were created with a mixture of motion-capture and CGI key-frame animation, as they were performed in motion-capture technology and animated in CGI.

Influences 
At New York Comic-Con 2016, Reeves explained that he and Bomback were influenced by many films before writing. He said, "One of the first things that Mark and I did because we had just finished Dawn was that we decided to watch a million movies. We decided to do what people fantasize what Hollywood screenwriters get to do but no one actually does. We got Fox to give us a theater and we watched movie after movie. We watched every Planet of the Apes movie, war movies, westerns, Empire Strikes Back... We just thought, 'We have to pretend we have all the time in the world,' even though we had limited time. We got really inspired." According to Reeves, the treacherous apes being nicknamed "donkeys" is both a reference to the video game character Donkey Kong and the fact that they are used as "pack mules".

Additionally, during production, Reeves and Bomback sought broader inspirations from films like The Bridge on the River Kwai and The Great Escape. Feeling that there was a need to imbue Biblical themes and elements, they also watched Biblical epics like Ben-Hur and The Ten Commandments. The influences and inspirations were made evident in the relationship between Caesar and Woody Harrelson's Colonel, a military leader with pretensions toward godhood. Reeves has compared their relationship to the dynamic between Alec Guinness's British Commander and Sessue Hayakawa's prison camp Colonel in Bridge on the River Kwai. Another comparison is in Caesar's journey to find the Colonel, flanked by a posse of close friends—a situation Reeves explicitly tied to Clint Eastwood's war-weary soldier in The Outlaw Josey Wales. Influences from the film Apocalypse Now, notably Harrelson's character and his Alpha-Omega faction being similar to Colonel Kurtz's renegade army, were also noted by several journalists. Harrelson has also acknowledged the similarities and inspiration. In the third act of the film, the words "Ape-ocalypse Now" are written on a wall in the Colonel's prison camp.

Music

On October 17, 2015, it was confirmed that Reeves' frequent collaborator Michael Giacchino, who composed its predecessor, would return to score for War for the Planet of the Apes. For Caesar, Giacchino had wrote few emotional themes that would focus on the character's emotional side, with Reeves' idea on turning Caesar into a sort of "mythical and historical character" and referred him to Exodus or Moses. Several themes were created on the character dynamics, his relationship with Nova and a theme for Colonel, had been produced into that process. The soundtrack was digitally released to iTunes and Amazon on July 14, 2017, and in its physical form by Sony Classical Records on July 28, 2017.

Release
The film was initially set for a July 15, 2016, release. However, in January 2015, Fox postponed the film's release date to about a year later on July 14, 2017.

Marketing
Special behind-the-scenes footage for the film was aired on TV on November 22, 2015, as part of a contest announcement presented by director Matt Reeves and Andy Serkis. The footage aired during The Walking Dead on AMC. The announcement allowed winners to wear a performance-capture suit and appear in a scene as an ape. The announcement was released on 20th Century Fox's official YouTube page later the same day.

At a New York Comic Con special event on October 6, 2016, Reeves, Serkis and producer Dylan Clark debuted an exclusive look at the film.

Serkis has also mentioned that the film would be accompanied by a video game, for which he performed motion capture. Titled Planet of the Apes: Last Frontier, the game was released for the PlayStation 4, Xbox One and PC in fall 2017.

Reception

Box office
War for the Planet of the Apes grossed $146.9 million in the United States and Canada and $343.8 million in other territories for a worldwide total of $490.7 million, against a production budget of $150–152 million.

In North America, the film was projected to gross $50–60 million in its opening weekend; however, given its acclaimed status and strong word-of-mouth, rival studios believed the film had the potential to debut as high as $70–80 million. War was closely monitored by analysts while the summer was witnessing a decline in ticket sales, a situation that they blamed on franchise fatigue for an overabundance of sequels and reboots (such as Pirates of the Caribbean: Dead Men Tell No Tales, Transformers: The Last Knight and The Mummy). However, box office analysts noted that well-reviewed films have tended to perform in-line with estimates (Guardians of the Galaxy Vol. 2, Wonder Woman and Spider-Man: Homecoming). The film grossed $5 million from Thursday night previews at 3,021 theaters, up 22% from the $4.1 million earned by its predecessor, and $22.1 million on its first day. It went on to debut to $56.3 million, topping the box office, albeit with a 22% drop from Dawns $72.6 million debut. In its second weekend, the film grossed $20.9 million (a drop of 62.9%, more than the 50.1% fall Dawn saw), finishing 4th at the box office. In its third weekend, the film made $10.5 million (dropping another 49.9%), finishing 6th at the box office. It was lower than the third weeks of both Rise ($16.1 million) and Dawn ($16.8 million).

Critical response
The website's critics consensus reads, "War for the Planet of the Apes combines breathtaking special effects and a powerful, poignant narrative to conclude this rebooted trilogy on a powerful—and truly blockbuster—note." Metacritic, which uses a weighted average, assigned the film a score of 82 out of 100 based on 50 critics, indicating "universal acclaim". Audiences polled by CinemaScore gave the film an average grade of "A−" on an A+ to F scale.

War for the Planet of the Apes received praise for the cast's performances (particularly Serkis'), Reeves' direction, visual effects, musical score, cinematography and its morally complex storyline. Scott Collura of IGN awarded the film a score of 9.5 out of 10, saying: "War for the Planet of the Apes is an excellent closing act to this rebooted trilogy, but also one that does enough world-building that the series can potentially continue from here—and it's a rare case where, after three movies, we're left wanting more." A. O. Scott of The New York Times said of the film, "War for the Planet of the Apes, directed by Matt Reeves, is the grimmest episode so far, and also the strongest, a superb example—rare in this era of sloppily constructed, commercially hedged cinematic universes—of clear thinking wedded to inventive technique in popular filmmaking," and lauded Andy Serkis's performance in the film, stating that "Andy Serkis's performance as Caesar is one of the marvels of modern screen acting."

Peter Travers of Rolling Stone gave the film 3.5 out of 4 stars, and said that Serkis performed "with a resonant power and depth of feeling that's nearly Shakespearean. Oscar, get busy: Serkis deserves the gold," and went on to say that "War for the Planet of the Apes—No. 9 in the simian cinema canon—is the best of the Apes films since the 1968 original." Eric Kohn of IndieWire gave the film a B+ rating, and praised Matt Reeves's directing, saying "It's a given that an expensive 21st-century sci-fi movie with talking animals, exploding tanks, and jarring machine guns would look and sound great, but Reeves applies these effects with such a measured strategy that they're always working in service of a greater narrative agenda." Kohn went on to applaud the visuals and musical score, stating that "The breathlessly paced montage of flying bullets and angry monkeys raining down on terrified men, aided by Michael Giacchino's vibrant score, is a strong indicator of the next-level craftsmanship that distinguishes these movies from so many cacophonous Hollywood spectacles; not only is the action easy to follow, but you care for the motion-captured characters at the center of it, while the humans cower in fear."

Home media
War for the Planet of the Apes was released on Digital HD on October 10, 2017, and on Blu-ray and DVD on October 24, 2017, by 20th Century Fox Home Entertainment.

Accolades

Sequel

According to screenwriter Rick Jaffa, a version of the spaceship from the 1968 Planet of the Apes under the name Icarus was in Rise of the Planet of the Apes as a deliberate hint to a possible sequel readapting the events of the original film, something the end of War also implies, featuring a younger version of the character Nova. During an interview of Andy Serkis with MTV in mid-November 2014, Serkis talked about possible sequels: "It might be three films, It could be four. It could be five. Who knows? The journey will continue." By October 2016, it was reported that a fourth Planet of the Apes film was being discussed. Shortly before the release of War in July 2017, Reeves said that he expressed interest in making more Apes films and that Steve Zahn, who played Bad Ape in the film, had set up a story for further sequels. Writer Mark Bomback hinted that more films would be possible, saying, "Truthfully, we haven't had those kinds of conversations. I've been working on these films for about seven years now. I'm ready to take a breather and let things rest a bit." In April 2019, following the acquisition of 21st Century Fox by Disney, Disney announced that future Planet of the Apes films are in development. It was also confirmed in August 2019 that any future installments would take place in the same universe first established in Rise.

On December 3, 2019, it was reported that Wes Ball is currently set to write and direct an untitled Planet of the Apes film. On February 17, 2020, it was reported that the film will be produced by Joe Hartwick Jr. and David Starke. Later that same day, Ball confirmed that he would be directing the film, and that it would be set after the events of War, following "Caesar's legacy". On May 26, 2020, Ball revealed that Josh Friedman will write the screenplay, while Jaffa and Silver will return as producers. He also said that, while the film will be set in the same universe as Rise, it won't be a direct sequel to War, saying that the film "will feel" like a follow-up to the overall Rise trilogy, but at the same time, the filmmakers will "do some really cool new stuff". Ball also said that the film could begin virtual production soon in spite of the COVID-19 pandemic due to it being a mostly CGI film. In a March 2022 interview with The Hollywood Reporter, 20th Century Studios president Steve Asbell stated that production would start between the late summer or early fall of 2022. In August 2022, Owen Teague was cast in the lead role. In September 2022, it was announced that the fourth movie in the current franchise would be titled Kingdom of the Planet of the Apes, that Freya Allan was cast as the human lead with Peter Macon co-starring, and that the film would be released in 2024. Wes Ball has been tabbed to direct the film, and it will pick up many years after the end of War for the Planet of the Apes. Production for the film began in October 2022 in Sydney at Disney Studios Australia.

Notes

References

External links

 
 

2017 films
2017 3D films
2017 science fiction action films
2010s prison drama films
2010s science fiction adventure films
2010s science fiction drama films
2010s science fiction war films
20th Century Fox films
American films about revenge
American prison drama films
American science fiction action films
American science fiction adventure films
American science fiction drama films
American science fiction war films
American sequel films
Apocalyptic films
American dystopian films
Chernin Entertainment films
2010s English-language films
Films about apes
Films directed by Matt Reeves
Films produced by Peter Chernin
Films scored by Michael Giacchino
Films set in San Francisco
Films set in forests
Films set in the future
Films set in 2028
Films shot in Alberta
Films shot in Vancouver
Films with screenplays by Mark Bomback
Films with screenplays by Matt Reeves
Films using motion capture
Planet of the Apes films
TSG Entertainment films
2010s American films